María Luisa Doig Calderón (born August 13, 1991 in Lima) is a Peruvian foil and epee fencer. At age sixteen, Doig made her official debut for the 2008 Summer Olympics in Beijing, where she competed in the women's individual foil event. She lost the first preliminary round match to Germany's Katja Wächter, with a score of 4–15.

References

External links
Profile – FIE
NBC 2008 Olympics profile

Peruvian female foil fencers
Living people
Olympic fencers of Peru
Fencers at the 2008 Summer Olympics
Sportspeople from Lima
1991 births
Fencers at the 2020 Summer Olympics
Peruvian female épée fencers
20th-century Peruvian women
21st-century Peruvian women